Kellie-Jay Keen-Minshull, also known as Posie Parker, is a British anti-transgender rights activist and the founder of the group Standing for Women. Keen has used posters, billboards, stickers, and social media to promote anti-trans messages, and she has organized events in the United Kingdom, the United States, and Australia that have been protested by supporters of transgender rights.

Biography 
Keen opposes laws and policies that allow transgender people to be legally recognised as their gender, the use of public bathrooms by transgender people according to their gender, the participation of transgender people in sports that align with their gender, and drag performances. She also opposes the use of puberty blockers and hormone replacement therapy for transgender children. 

Keen founded the organization Standing for Women in 2020. She is also a special advisor to the Women's Liberation Front (WoLF).

Social media

In 2018, after a complaint from Susie Green, then CEO of transgender charity Mermaids, Keen was interviewed by West Yorkshire Police for suspicion of malicious communication in relation to tweets made by Keen. In 2019, Keen said she was interviewed by Wiltshire Police for suspicion of harassment due to two YouTube videos she had produced that directed criticism at Green for supporting her daughter's transition. The 2018 case was closed with no further action.

In May 2018, Woman's Place UK, an organization that opposes gender self-identification for trans people, announced that it had disinvited Keen from a meeting, based on objections to "her stated views on race and religion." In 2022, Woman's Place UK published screenshots they said were from Keen's Twitter account and since deleted, to "clarify our own political ground", stating they had invited Keen to discuss the 2018 police investigation related to her tweets, and since then, "many of her subsequent connections, statements and actions have only strengthened our decision not to work with her." 

On 30 January 2019, Sarah McBride, a transgender rights activist and press secretary for the Human Rights Campaign (HRC), participated in a panel discussion between members of the Parents for Transgender Equality National Council and members of the United States Congress, during a visit to Capitol Hill to advocate for the Equality Act. Afterwards, Keen and Julia Long entered the room in the Cannon House Office Building where McBride was working, and recorded themselves on Facebook Live yelling at and misgendering her. 

In response to the 30 January incident, an HRC spokesperson stated: "It is disturbing but not at all surprising that anti-transgender extremists brought to the United States at the behest of The Heritage Foundation would stoop to harassing a transgender woman and parents of transgender youth." A spokesperson for The Heritage Foundation denied a connection to the presence of Keen and Long in the United States and said in reference to a Heritage Foundation panel discussion attended by Keen that the organization had "no contact with them before or after our Jan. 28 event, and have zero connection to anything they did afterward." 

In October 2019, Keen appeared in a video interview with Jean-François Gariépy, a far-right YouTuber who advocates for a "white ethno-state". She has also given an interview to Soldiers of Christ Online, a far-right network. Keen denied prior knowledge of the interviewers' far-right affiliations. In 2019, Jean Hatchet, a gender-critical activist, expressed concerns about what she described as "right-wing links" developed by Keen in the US, as well as her connections to The Heritage Foundation, writing on her blog: "I don't care what these people think about trans ideology. That cannot be separated from the things they do and advocate that specifically harm women."

In 2021, Keen produced a YouTube video about Mridul Wadhwa, the director of the Edinburgh Rape Crisis Centre (ERCC), who has faced threats of violence that led to increased security at the ERCC, and has been the focus of an activist and social media campaign opposed to her hiring because she is a trans woman. Keen referred to Wadhwa as a "male CEO."

She praised Tommy Robinson in a podcast for Feminist Current.

Posters, billboards, and stickers 
In September 2018, under the pseudonym "Posie Parker", Keen paid the advertising company Primesight to place a billboard poster in Liverpool with the text "woman, wʊmən, noun, adult human female", telling the BBC it was in response to support expressed by Liverpool mayor Joe Anderson for the trans community. Primesight removed the poster following a complaint, stating it had been "unaware of the motive" and "misled" and was "fully committed to equality for all". In response to the poster, LGBT charity Stonewall noted their 2018 Trans Report on violence and hate crimes against trans people, stating: "These are not just statistics, they represent the lives of trans people, which are only being made worse by increasingly frequent attacks in the media, online and in public spaces." 

Standing for Women had a digital version of the poster placed on a billboard in Leeds on 19 October 2018, and Kong Outdoor, which owns the billboard, removed it pending investigation.

In May 2019, a sticker stating "Women only. This is a single sex service under the Equality Act 2010" that was produced by Standing for Women and designed to appear official was removed from a Dundee train station bathroom door after station staff were alerted. Keen denied that the group had placed the sticker.

On 27 July 2020, Keen paid for a poster reading "I ❤ JK Rowling" to be displayed at Waverley Station in Edinburgh. Rowling had recently elicited controversy for her views on trans people. The poster was taken down by the Scotland wing of Network Rail on 30 July, who stated that the poster was removed for violating its advertising guidelines due to its political nature.

HelloPrint, the company that had produced stickers, t-shirts, and other merchandise for Keen over five years announced in 2023 that it would no longer fill orders for Keen, and "If we had been fully aware of her beliefs earlier, we would earlier have refused to print for her."

Rallies, speaker events, and protests

United Kingdom 

A 15 May 2022 rally organized by Keen was interrupted by a woman, posing as a speaker, who took the microphone to say: "I just wanna say that I am a cis female and I recognise trans women in women's spaces as alright, and I don't think we need to protest that, I don't think we need the vitriolic hate. Trans women are women!" The microphone was eventually recovered by Keen after the woman was chased by rally organizers and the crowd booed and chanted. Allie Crew, an artist whose work the speakers stood in front of during the rally, tweeted in response to it: "I am greatly saddened that my work was re-appropriated like this and I do not share their views. I promote all human rights". Keen said in response that counter-protesters had blocked access to the Emmeline Pankhurst statue. 

On 19 June 2022, Keen and approximately 60 supporters held a rally in Bristol, which was met by approximately 100 counter-protestors organized by Bristol Against Hate. Avon and Somerset police said police separated the groups by forming a line, and that "while both groups at times raised their voices, there were no physical confrontations. The right to protest is a fundamental democratic right and we are pleased to have been able to facilitate both these demonstrations."

On 18 September 2022, a rally in Brighton organized by Keen as part of a speakers tour was met by hundreds of counter-protesters. Sussex police reported three arrests, including a 50-year-old man who attended the event to support Keen and later admitted in court to assault of a counter-demonstrator. 

At a Standing For Women rally in Newcastle upon Tyne on 15 January 2023, speaker Lisa Morgan referred to "the big lie", including that it was "first described by Adolf Hitler in Mein Kampf", and said "The big lie is that trans women are women." Queer.de reported Keen appeared "visibly and audibly in a good mood" after the speech, based on a YouTube video of the event posted to Keen's account. A spokesperson for Cabaret Against The Hate Speech, a Scottish LGBT collective, announced plans to counterprotest Keen's speaker event scheduled for 5 February in Glasgow, and stated "she was using Nazi theory, the big lie which was what they used against the Jews, to justify her transphobia. At no point did anybody on Keen's team or Keen challenge that. No one in the group did anything afterwards, they didn’t apologise, they were actually trying to justify it."

United States 

In January 2020, Keen spoke at a panel organized by the Women's Liberation Front (WoLF) in New York.

In March 2022, Keen attended the NCAA Division I Women's Swimming Championship in Atlanta and led a group protesting the inclusion of Lia Thomas. She later appeared on Tucker Carlson Tonight, a conservative American talk show, to discuss this protest. On 16 March 2022, Keen was a panelist at an event in New York City titled "How 'Gender Equality' Cheats Women and Girls", hosted by the Center for Bioethics and Culture Network.

On 16 October 2022, Keen began a series of public speaking events organized by Standing for Women in the United States that were intended to tour eleven cities, starting in Los Angeles. In Los Angeles and the second stop in San Francisco, few supporters attended, and there were no counter-protesters nor police at the events. Keen said threats from Antifa led her to cancel the speakers for an event in Portland, Oregon. In a video published on Twitter, an attendee at the Portland event was hit in the face with a pie.

At an event on 26 October in Tacoma, Washington, Keen spoke to about 30 attendees. During the event, about 20 counter-protesters were outside of the plaza where the event was held, and then as their number grew to about 200,  counter-protesters entered the plaza. Pepper spray was used on several counter-protesters. 

At the 29 October event in Austin, Texas, Keen was observed to have protection from armed security guards, and at the 30 October event in Chicago, Keen said she had uniformed Chicago police officers escort her through crowds. Counter-protestors at the Chicago event rallied at Cityfront Plaza. 

On 14 November, nine people were arrested at an event outside City Hall in New York City, after a confrontation between counter-protesters and attendees.

Australia and New Zealand 
In January 2023, Keen announced plans to tour Australia and New Zealand in March. Stephen Bates, the Australian Greens' spokesperson for LGBTQIA+ communities, wrote to Immigration Minister Andrew Giles asking him to revoke Keen's visa, and posted the letter online but redacted her name, stating, "I won't be sharing their name because I don’t want to amplify their hate speech." Keen later said she was the subject of the letter. 

A petition also launched on Change.org to oppose the visa. By 18 February, the petition was removed, because according to a Change.org spokesperson, the website "received a legal claim on this petition and in order to comply with Australia’s defamation law, we were forced to remove it from the platform." According to LGBTQIA+ rights activist Chris Johnson, who started the petition, there had been more than 11,167 signatures.

Keen's Melbourne event on 18 March was supported by a group of at least 30 neo-Nazis, organized by the National Socialist Network and its leader Thomas Sewell, who were seen performing the Nazi salute on the steps of Parliament House and displaying a banner that read "DESTROY PAEDO FREAKS". Overall attendance at the event was estimated to be between 300 to 400 supporters at the anti-transgender protest led by Keen, and about twice as many counterprotesters. After the Melbourne event, Keen stated with regard to the neo-Nazis at the event, "They're absolutely not associated with me whatsoever. I absolutely abhor anything to do with Nazis. It's preposterous they even exist in 2023.”

Following campaigning by the Rainbow Greens, the LGBTQIA+ network of the Green Party of Aotearoa New Zealand, Keen's permission to enter the country was put under review by Immigration New Zealand on 20 March.

Sheffield Central MP campaign 
In September 2022, in response to Eddie Izzard's announcement of her plan to run for MP of Sheffield Central, Keen announced her own plan to run, saying she would "campaign on the basis of repealing the Gender Recognition Act" and "erase the word 'gender. During her livestreamed announcement, she promoted her own merchandise, called the hijab "atrocious" and a "tool of oppression", said she wouldn't boycott PayPal over their removal of service for anti-LGBT group Free Speech Union, and called Tucker Carlson "an intelligent, really lovely, welcoming, warmly welcoming man".

Personal life 

Keen was raised in Somerset and has an older sister, a husband, and four children.

On 30 September 2018, someone created a fake social media account impersonating Keen's husband and sharing her personal information, including her name and address.

References

External links
Standing for Women official website

Transphobia in the United Kingdom
Living people
British women activists
Year of birth missing (living people)
People from Somerset
Alumni of the University of Leeds